Darier's disease (DAR) is an inherited skin disorder that presents with multiple greasy, crusting, thick brown bumps that merge into patches.

It is an autosomal dominant disorder discovered by French dermatologist Ferdinand-Jean Darier. Darier's is characterized by dark crusty patches on the skin that are mildly greasy and that emit a strong odor. These patches, also known as keratotic papules, keratosis follicularis, or dyskeratosis follicularis, most often appear on the scalp, forehead, upper arms, chest, back, knees, elbows, and behind the ear.

Mild forms of the disease are the most common, consisting solely of skin rashes that flare up under certain conditions such as high humidity, high stress, or tight-fitting clothes. Short stature, when combined with poorly-formed fingernails that contain vertical striations, is diagnostic even for mild forms of DAR. Symptoms will usually appear in late childhood or early adulthood between the ages of 15 to 30 years and will vary over the course of one's life.

Signs and symptoms
 Clinical symptoms  of the disease:
 Seborrhoeic areas
 This is defined as areas where excess oil and sebum is released.
 Overall greasy or scaly skin either in the central chest and back or in the folds of the skin.
 Fragile or poorly formed fingernails
 Nail disease leading to V-shaped nicks at the edge of the nail.
 Rash that covers many areas of the body
 The rash is often associated with a strong unpleasant odor
 The rash can be aggravated by heat, humidity, and exposure to sunlight.
 Mucosal manifestation
 White cobblestone pattern of small papules
 Overgrowth of gums
 Usually affects the mouth, esophagus, rectum, vulva, vagina
 Oral symptoms  can be diagnosed by a routine dental examination
 Other symptoms and their overall prevalence in the affected population:
 In 80 to 90% of patients
 Acrokeratosis verruciformis
 Acrokeratosis is characterized by several small wart-like and flat-topped bumps that line the skin on typically the hand and feet.
 Hypermelanotic macule
 Patches on the skin that contain excess pigment, they often appear as dark patches in the skin.
 Pruritus
 Itching
 Subungual hyperkeratotic fragments
 Thickened skin that is often discolored, under nails, on either hands or feet.
 Palmar pits
 Usually red in color, they are pits or depressions in the palms or soles of the hands and feet.
 In 30 to 79% of patients
 Abnormal hair morphology
 Acne conglobata
 Typically described as cystic acne

Genetics
Mutations in a single gene, ATP2A2, are responsible for the development of Darier's disease. ATP2A2 encodes the SERCA2 protein, which is a calcium pump localized to the membranes of the endoplasmic reticulum (ER) in nearly all cells and the sarcoplasmic reticulum (SR) in muscle cells. The ER is where protein processing and transport begins for proteins targeted for secretion.  The SR is a specialized form of ER found in muscle cells that sequesters calcium, the regulated efflux of which into the cytosol stimulates muscle fiber contraction. Calcium acts as a second messenger in many cellular signal transduction pathways.  SERCA2 is required for Ca2+ signaling in cells by removing nearly all Ca2+ ions from the cytoplasm and storing them in the ER/SR compartments.

A large number of mutant alleles of ATP2A2 have been identified in association with Darier's Disease. One study of 19 families and 6 sporadic cases found 24 specific, novel mutations associated with DAR symptoms. This study reported a loose, imperfect correlation between the severity of ATP2A2 mutations with the severity of the condition.  Significant variability in disease severity between members of the same family carrying the same mutation was also reported by this study, suggesting that genetic modifiers contribute to the phenotypic penetrance of certain mutations.

The mutation is inherited in an autosomal dominant pattern. This means that only one allele needs to be mutated  in order to express the trait. This also means that someone who is born to one parent with DAR has a 50% chance of inheriting the mutant allele and having the disease. Loss-of-function mutations typically display recessive inheritance while the gain-of-function or hyperactive function of proteins is characteristic of dominant mutations.  The observation that only one mutated allele of the SERCA2 is sufficient to produce clinical symptoms suggests that proper "gene dosage" is necessary for maintaining Ca2+ homeostasis in cells. This means that two wild type copies of ATP2A2 are needed for proper cell function, which provides a logical basis for dominant phenotypes arising from loss-of-function alleles.  Most ATP2A2 mutations are haploinsufficiency mutations, which means that only having only one functional copy of the functional gene results in a reduced level of protein expression that is not sufficient for wild type function for making enough of the coded protein for the cell to function properly. However, there is significant variability in disease severity in how the mutations are expressed even within families that have the same mutation. It is currently unclear in the current research why a reduction in SERCA2 expression/activity causes clinical symptoms restricted to the epidermis.  One hypothesis that some researchers have given is that other cell types express additional "back-up" Ca2+ pumps that can compensate for the reduced function or expression of the SERCA2 protein, while skin cells rely exclusively on the SERCA2 gene for calcium sequestration, meaning only they are affected by its reduction in expression.

As mentioned above, some cases of DAR result from somatic mutations to ATP2A2 in epidermal stem cells. These cases are referred to as instances of "linear" Darier's disease. Such individuals display phenotypic mosaicism, where the Darier's phenotype only affects the subset of epidermal tissue arising from the mutated progenitor cell.  Somatic mutations are not inherited by the offspring of such individuals.

Diagnosis
Diagnosis of Darier disease is often made by the appearance of the skin, family history, or genetic testing for the mutation in the ATP2A2 gene. However, many individuals affected by this disorder are never diagnosed, due to the mildness of symptoms in most cases. Mild cases present clinically are minor rashes (without odor) that can become exacerbated by heat, humidity, stress, and sunlight. The symptoms of the disease are thought to be caused by an abnormality in the desmosome-keratin filament complex leading to a breakdown in cell adhesion.

Darier's disease is an incommunicable disorder that is seen in males and females equally. Symptoms typically arise between the ages of 15 and 30.  One study of 100 British individuals diagnosed with Darier's disease reported that affected individuals display elevated frequencies of neuropsychiatric conditions. There were high lifetime rates for mood disorders (50%), including depression (30%), bipolar disorder (4%), suicidal thoughts (31%), and suicide attempts (13%), suggesting a possible common genetic link.  Several case studies have suggested affected populations display elevated frequencies of learning disorders, but this has yet to be confirmed.

Treatment 
Treatment of Darier disease depends on the severity of the presented clinical symptoms. In most minor cases, the disorder can be managed using sunscreen, moisturizing lotions, avoidance of non-breathable clothing, and excessive perspiration. In more severe cases of Darier's disease, hospitalisation may be required to heal affected individuals who display frequent relapse and remit patterns. In less severe cases, signs and symptoms may clear up completely through hygienic interventions. Most patients with Darier's disease live normal, healthy lives. Rapid resolution of rash symptoms can be complicated due to the increased vulnerability of affected skin surfaces by secondary bacterial or viral infections. Epidermal Staphylococcus aureus, human papillomavirus (HPV) and herpes simplex virus (HSV) infections have been reported. In these cases, topical and/or oral antibiotic/antiviral medications may need to be prescribed.

Typical recommendations are:
 Application of antiseptics
 Soak in astringents
 Antibiotics
 Benzoyl peroxide
 Topical diclofenac sodium

If Darier's is more localized, common treatments include:
 Topical retinoids: used to help in the reduction of hyperkeratosis, retinoids work by causing the skin cells in the top layers to die and be shed off. The common retinoids used for this disorder are:
 Adapalene
 Tazarotene gel
 Tretinoin
 Dermabrasion
 Removal of the top layer of skin to help smooth and stimulate new growth of the skin.
 Electrosurgery
 Used to help stop bleeding and remove abnormal skin growths.
 Topical corticosteroids

If symptoms are severe, oral retinoids be prescribed and have been proven to be 90% effective. However, there can be many adverse side-effects associated with prolonged use. Common oral retinoids are:
 Acitretin
 Isotretinoin
 Cyclosporine

Some patients are able to prevent flares with use of topical sunscreens and oral vitamin C.

Further information on and advocacy work for Darier's disease are provided by the FIRST Skin Foundation.

Epidemiology 
Worldwide prevalence is estimated as between 1:30,000 and 1:100,000.  Case studies have shown estimated prevalence by country to be 3.8:100,000 in Slovenia, 1:36,000 in north-east England, 1:30,000 in Scotland, and 1:100,000 in Denmark.

History 
Darier's disease was first described in a paper from 1917 by the dermatologist Ferdinand-Jean Darier in the French dermatological journal Annales de dermatologie et de syphilographie. Darier was a well-regarded dermatologist of the time who was the head of the medical department at the Hôpital Saint-Louis. Darier was an early proponent of histopathology, or the examination of samples of diseased flesh under a microscope to determine the cause of illnesses. Using this technique, he was able to uncover the origins of Darier's disease and a host of others that also bear his name.

James Clark White, a dermatologist at Harvard Medical School, independently characterized and published his observations on this dermatological disorder in the same year as Darier (1889), which is why Darier's disease is also referred to as Darier-White disease.

See also 
 Linear Darier disease
 List of cutaneous conditions
 Darier's sign

References 
Cardoso CL, Freitas P, Taveira LAA, Consolaro A. Darier disease:
case report with oral manifestations. Med Oral Patol Oral
Cir Bucal 2006;11:E404-6

Autosomal dominant disorders
Conditions of the skin appendages
Genodermatoses
Oral mucosal pathology
Papulosquamous hyperkeratotic cutaneous conditions